Hà Văn Tấn (16 August 1937 – 27 November 2019) was a Vietnamese historian, archeologist, and scholar of Buddhism. He was born in Tiên Điền, Nghi Xuân, Hà Tĩnh, and became a professor at Vietnam National University, Hanoi.

References

20th-century Vietnamese historians
Vietnamese archaeologists
People from Hà Tĩnh province
1937 births
2019 deaths
21st-century Vietnamese historians